Exuperius and Zoe are Christian martyrs who were murdered in AD 127. They were spouses and slaves of a pagan in Pamphylia, in modern Turkey. They were murdered with their sons, Cyriacus and Theodolus, for refusing to participate in pagan rites when one of their sons was born.

Notes

127 deaths
2nd-century Christian martyrs
Saints from Roman Anatolia
Year of birth unknown
Groups of Christian martyrs of the Roman era
Married couples
Christian slaves and freedmen